Ronald Henry Gould (born September 15, 1965) is an American football coach and former player who is the running backs coach for the Los Angeles Rams of the National Football League (NFL). Prior to this position, he was the former running backs coach for the Stanford Cardinal football team. He was also the head coach at the University of California, Davis (UC Davis) from 2013 to 2016. Gould was previously an assistant coach at the University of California, Berkeley. He spent sixteen seasons at Cal, all as running backs coach from 1997 to 2012 under head coaches Tom Holmoe and Jeff Tedford.

Coaching career

UC Davis
On December 17, 2012, Gould was named the football head coach at UC Davis. He was released early from his five-year contract on November 21, 2016.

Head coaching record

References

External links
 Stanford profile

1965 births
Living people
African-American coaches of American football
African-American players of American football
American football defensive backs
Boise State Broncos football coaches
California Golden Bears football coaches
Oregon Ducks football coaches
Oregon Ducks football players
Players of American football from Tucson, Arizona
Portland State Vikings football coaches
Scottsdale Fighting Artichokes football players
UC Davis Aggies football coaches
Wichita State Shockers football players
21st-century African-American people
20th-century African-American sportspeople